La Nkwantanang Madina Municipal District is one of the twenty-nine districts in Greater Accra Region, Ghana. Originally it was formerly part of the then-larger Ga East District in 2004, until the eastern part of the district was split off to create La-Nkwantanang-Madina Municipal District on 28 June 2012, which was established by Legislative Instrument (L.I.) 2131; thus the remaining part has been retained as Ga East Municipal District. The municipality is located in the western part of Greater Accra Region and has Madina as its capital town.

Geography
The district is bordered to the north by Akuapim South District (in the Eastern Region), to the east by Kpone Katamanso Municipal District and Adenta Municipal District, to the south by the Accra Metropolis District, and to the west by Ga East Municipal District. The total area of the district is 70.887 square kilometers.

Population
According to the 2010 census, the population of the district is 111,926, with 54,271 males and 57,655 females. The current population based Ghana Statistical Service record is 137,975.

References

Accra

Greater Accra Region

Districts of Greater Accra Region